Yurammia is a placoderm from what is now the Pambula River in New South Wales. Unlike all other known phyllolepids, Yurammia's plates had no external grooves.

References

Phyllolepids
Placoderms of Antarctica